Daryurd is a village and municipality in the Gadabay District of Azerbaijan. It has a population of 1,548.  The municipality consists of the villages of Daryurd, Jafarli, and Naghylar.

References 

Populated places in Gadabay District